Sekou Jabateh Oliseh (born 5 June 1990) is a Liberian professional footballer who plays as a right winger for Liberian side LISCR.

Early and personal life
Born in Monrovia, Liberia, Oliseh was adopted by Nigerian former professional footballer Churchill Oliseh at a young age. His uncles are fellow footballers Azubuike Oliseh, Egutu Oliseh and Sunday Oliseh.

Club career

Early career
Oliseh began his career in his adopted home country Nigeria with Ebedei, before moving to Danish side Midtjylland in 2006. Between 2008 and 2009, Oliseh made 5 league appearances for Midtjylland, before moving on loan to Russian side CSKA Moscow in July 2009. In December 2009, the loan deal became permanent as Oliseh signed a 5-year deal with CSKA.

CSKA Moscow
Oliseh made his debut for CSKA on 4 October 2009 against Kuban Krasnodar and scored his first goal on the same day. He entered the match as a substitute for striker Tomáš Necid in the 70th minute and scored nine minutes later to complete a 4–0 victory for the Army men. He then made his UEFA Champions League debut as a substitute against Beşiktaş on 8 December 2009, replacing Miloš Krasić in the 82nd minute at the BJK İnönü Stadium.

However, he was not able to secure a first team spot in 2010, due to the presence of fellow attacking midfielder Krasić. Following Krasić's transfer saga to Juventus, Oliseh received a rare start and did not disappoint. He scored a double in the first half against Anzhi Makhachkala on 15 August 2010, tallying in the 12th minute and then just before halftime for manager Leonid Slutskiy's squad. Another winning goal followed on 20 September, scoring the only goal in the home victory against Sibir Novosibirsk.

Oliseh joined Greek club PAOK on loan in January 2013, with the deal being in extended in July 2013. Oliseh again went out on loan in July 2014, this time to Kuban Krasnodar, returning to CSKA during the winter break after Kuban declined to extend his loan. Oliseh officially left CSKA upon on the expiration of his contract in June 2015.

Oliseh joined Astra Giurgiu in March 2016.

He signed a contract with China League One side Dalian Yifang on 24 June 2016.
He left the Dalian Yifang in December 2016.

LISCR FC
On 17 October 2020, Oliseh returned to football, signing a one-year contract with Liberian First Division side LISCR.

International career
Oliseh, who had represented his adopted nation of Nigeria since childhood, received a call-up to the Liberian team from manager Bertalan Bicskei in September 2010 for a 2012 Africa Cup of Nations qualification match against Zimbabwe. Oliseh would honor the invitation, citing star Liberian forward George Weah as a key motivating factor behind his decision. "I have my entire family and friends here in Liberia who would love to see me play for our nation, I love Nigeria but I can't play for them," said Oliseh.

Oliseh then made his debut on 5 September 2010 against Zimbabwe and scored the equalizing goal in a 1–1 draw for Liberia.

References

External links
 

1990 births
Living people
Sportspeople from Monrovia
Liberian footballers
Liberian expatriate footballers
Liberia international footballers
Nigerian footballers
Nigerian people of Liberian descent
Sportspeople of Liberian descent
Expatriate men's footballers in Denmark
PFC CSKA Moscow players
PAOK FC players
Russian Premier League players
Expatriate footballers in Russia
FC Midtjylland players
Danish Superliga players
FC Kuban Krasnodar players
Association football wingers
F.C. Ebedei players
Liberian expatriate sportspeople in Romania
Expatriate footballers in Romania
Liga I players
FC Astra Giurgiu players
China League One players
Dalian Professional F.C. players
Expatriate footballers in China
Nigerian adoptees
LISCR FC players